Pies Descalzos is the third studio album and international debut by Colombian singer and songwriter Shakira, released on 6 October 1995, by Sony Music Colombia and Columbia Records. Its music incorporates Latin pop styles, additionally experimenting with pop rock elements. Looking to revive her struggling career after the commercial failures of her first two studio efforts Magia and Peligro, she assumed a prominent position in its production. As executive producer, Luis Fernando Ochoa co-wrote and co-produced each of the eleven tracks on the record with Shakira.

Pies Descalzos received generally favorable reviews from music critics, who complimented it as a strong debut showing. Commercially, the project became Shakira's breakthrough record, with which she established notability throughout Latin America. It was awarded the "Diamond Prism" in her native Colombia, acknowledging one million copies sold in the nation. The album additionally peaked at numbers three and five on the US Billboard Latin Pop Albums and Latin Albums component charts, respectively. It was later certified platinum by the Recording Industry Association of America (RIAA). The album was also a breakthrough for Shakira in the country according to John Lannert of Billboard.

Six singles were released from Pies Descalzos, all of which attained commercial success in the United States. Its lead single "Estoy Aquí" peaked at number 2 on the Billboard Latin Songs component chart, and was her first track promoted through an accompanying music video. Follow-up singles "¿Dónde Estás Corazón?", "Pies Descalzos, Sueños Blancos', "Un Poco de Amor", "Antología", and "Se Quiere, Se Mata" peaked within the top 20 of the chart. The record was additionally promoted through the Tour Pies Descalzos, which visited North and South America and Europe throughout 1996 and 1997. The album was reissued as Colección de Oro in 2002.

Background 

In 1990, a 13-year-old Shakira signed a recording contract with Sony Music. Her debut studio album Magia was released in 1991, and largely consisted of tracks she had written since she was eight years old. Commercially, the project struggled, selling an underwhelming 1,200 copies in her native Colombia. Her follow-up record Peligro was released in 1993, and suffered a similar failure. Consequently, Shakira took a two-year hiatus, allowing her to complete her high school education. Looking to revive her struggling career, Shakira decided to make an international debut studio album.
Pies Descalzos was produced on a budget of $100,000, since it was expected to only move 100,000 copies.

Composition

Pies Descalzos primarily focuses on Latin pop genres, though it experiments with pop rock styles. Assuming a prominent position in its production, she co-wrote and co-produced each of the 11 tracks included on the record. The albums opens with "Estoy Aquí" ("I'm Here"), which sees prominent uses of guitar instrumentation. Lyrically, it discusses a willingness to correct a failed relationship. The pop ballad "Antología" ("Anthology") notes an appreciation of the knowledge a lover has shared. "Un Poco de Amor" ("A Little Bit of Love") states that Shakira is waiting to find someone who loves her. It became her first track to include phrases in English, performed by the uncredited Howard Glasford, and additionally experiments with elements of reggae music.

The guitar-driven "Quiero" ("I Want") explains Shakira's happiness upon the return of a lover. Similarly, the mid-tempo "Te Necesito" ("I Need You") and the upbeat "Vuelve" ("Return") describe her yearning for a romantic partner to re-enter her life. "Te Espero Sentada" ("I Wait Sitting") expresses a desire for a romantic partner to be aware of the sorrow his absence brings to Shakira. "Pies Descalzos, Sueños Blancos" ("Bare Feet, White Dreams") suggests that one is happiest when living a carefree lifestyle, while "Pienso en Ti" ("I Think of You") notes that Shakira thinks more about a lover as times progresses. The penultimate track "¿Dónde Estás Corazón?" ("Where Are You Love?") asks that her boyfriend comes back to her. The album closes with its eleventh track "Se Quiere, Se Mata" ("You Want, You Kill"), which tells the story of expectant parents Braulio and Dana, and sees the usage of a harmonica during its chorus.

Singles
"Estoy Aquí" was serviced as the lead single from Pies Descalzos in 1995. It was met with positive reviews from music critics, who recognized it as a stand-out track from its parent album. Additionally, it became Shakira's first recording to attain commercial success. The song peaked at numbers 1 and 2 on the Billboard Latin Pop Songs and Latin Songs component charts. "Estoy Aquí" became the first track by Shakira to receive an accompanying music video, and was directed by Simon Brand. The setting depicts a barn during the fall and wintertime, and shows a black-haired Shakira performing the song with her guitar.

"¿Dónde Estás Corazón?" was originally featured on a Colombian compilation album Nuestro Rock. After attaining success on the record, it was later released as the second single from Pies Descalzos, and was also embraced as a highlight from the record. The track peaked at numbers 3 and 5 on the Billboard Latin Pop Songs and Latin Songs charts, respectively. Its music video was directed by Gustavo Garzón, and shows various scenes of Shakira holding photographs, sitting in a red chair, and singing in the rain.

"Pies Descalzos, Sueños Blancos" was serviced as the third single from its parent album, and was praised for its melody and songwriting. In comparison to its preceding singles, the track slightly underperformed, reaching number 11 on the Billboard Latin Pop Songs chart. Its accompanying music video was directed by Garzón, and films Shakira singing while attending an upper class masquerade ball.

"Un Poco de Amor" became the fourth single from the project, and was appreciated for its prominent reggae influences. It peaked at number 11 on both the Billboard Latin Songs and Latin Pop Songs charts. The music video was directed by Garzón, and depicts Shakira dancing with uncredited guest vocalist Howard Glasford, in addition to members of various ethnic groups.

The fifth single "Antología" peaked at numbers 3 and 15 on the Latin Pop Songs and Latin Songs charts, respectively. The track did not receive a formal music video, though a performance in Miami during the Oral Fixation Tour was officially released to YouTube in 2007.

The sixth and final single "Se Quiere, Se Mata" reached numbers 1 and 8 on the Latin Pop Songs and Latin Songs charts, respectively. Its music video was directed by Juan Carlos Martin; it tells the story of Braulio and Dana, who succumb to their sexual desires, resulting in Dana's pregnancy. It concludes as Dana goes to abort her unborn child, and dies herself.

Tour

To further promote Pies Descalzos, Shakira embarked on the Tour Pies Descalzos during 1996 and 1997. During the tour Shakira visited most Latin American countries. The show in Mexico City attracted over 10,000 fans. By its conclusion, she visited ten countries and performed twenty-one shows across two continents. The concert in Ecuador was filmed and was broadcast on national television.

Critical reception

In retrospect, Pies Descalzos received generally favorable reviews from music critics, who complimented it as a strong debut showing. Carlos Quintana from About.com appreciated Shakira's "combination of styles, well thought lyrics and music arrangements", and placed it among her strongest bodies of work. Jose F. Promis of Allmusic opined that the record "[balanced] heartfelt, earnest ballads with catchy, jangly pop/rock" and was a "solid debut". A reviewer from Billboard provided a positive review, opining that the record "[carries] passion, conviction, and honesty". At the 1997 Billboard Latin Music Awards, the album received two awards for "Pop Album of the Year by a Female Artist" and "Pop Album of the Year by a New Artist". It was also nominated at the 9th Lo Nuestro Awards in 1997 for "Pop Album of the Year", but lost to Enrique Iglesias's album Vivir. Shakira herself received the Lo Nuestro Awards for "Pop Female Artist of the Year" and "Pop New Artist of the Year". In 2015, Billboard listed Pies Descalzos as one of the Essential Latin Albums of Past 50 Year stating that "Finally, Latin rock had found its muse".

Commercial performance
Commercially, the project became Shakira's breakthrough record, with which she established notability throughout Latin America. In Argentina, it attained double-platinum certification after passing 120,000 in sold copies. In her native Colombia, the album was awarded the "Diamond Prism" by her record label, acknowledging sales of one million units. It was awarded platinum in Ecuador, Venezuela, Peru, Chile, Mexico and Central America.

Elsewhere, the album peaked at number 71 on the German Albums Chart. In the United States, it failed to chart on the Billboard 200. However, it reached number 34 on the Billboard Hot Heatseekers Albums component chart, and additionally peaked at numbers 3 and 5 on the Latin Pop Albums and Latin Albums charts. It was later certified platinum by the Recording Industry Association of America (RIAA) for shipments of one million copies. As of 2008, Pies Descalzos has sold over five million copies. , it has sold 580,000 copies in the US, making it the 23rd bestselling Latin album in the country according to Nielsen SoundScan. In Latin America the album sold over 2 million copies.

Track listing

Personnel 
Credits adapted from Allmusic.

 Shakira – producer, vocals
 Luis Fernando Ochoa – producer, background vocals, guitar, keyboards, harmonica, percussion
 Alvaro Farfan – director
Victor Di Persia – Recording and Mixing Engineer'''''
 Camillo Montilla – engineer, piano
 Sonido Azulado – engineer
 Henry Gerhart - live audio engineer
 Luly Deya – assistant engineer
 José Martínez – assistant engineer
 Freddi Niño – assistant engineer
 Juan Antonio Castillo – mixing
 Michael Fuller – mastering
 Sergio Solano – guitar
 Italo Lamboglia – drums
 Gonzo Vasquez – programming, drums, percussion, background vocals
 Jose Gaviria – background vocals
 Andrea Piñeros – background vocals
 Jose Garcia – bass guitar
 Alejandro Gomez – harmonica
 Eusebio Valderrama – trumpet
 Samuel Torres – percussion
 Felipe Dothe – design
 Javier Hincapie – design
 Patricia Bonilla – photography
 Miguel Angel Velandia – photography

Charts

Weekly charts

Year-end charts

Certifications and sales

See also
 1995 in Latin music
 List of best-selling albums in Brazil
 List of best-selling albums in Colombia
 List of best-selling albums in Mexico
 List of best-selling Latin albums
 List of best-selling Latin albums in the United States

References

External links
 Shakira.com > Discography > Pies Descalzos
 Rate Your Music review
 Fundación Pies Descalzos

1995 albums
Shakira albums
Sony Music Colombia albums
Spanish-language albums